Jeanne Beijerman-Walraven (14 June 1878 – 20 September 1969) was a Dutch composer. She was born in Semarang, Indonesia, and studied privately with Frits Koeberg in The Hague.

Beijerman-Walraven's early compositions were late Romantic in style, but she adopted contemporary techniques and later works became more Expressionist. Although she received recognition early in her career, her work was seldom played after the 1920s. She died in Arnhem.

Works
Selected works include:
Concert Overture for orchestra, 1910
Orkeststuk for orchestra, 1921
Lento and Allegro moderato for orchestra, 1921
Sonata, violin, pianoforte, 1909, 1952
Koraal, organ/pianoforte, 1911
String Quartet, 1912
2 stukken, pianoforte, 1929
Andante espressivo con molta emozione, pianoforte, 1950
Pan (H. Gorter), S, pf
Het is winter, S, pf
Licht mijn licht, SATB
Uit de wijzangen (R. Tagore, trans. F. van Eeden), Mezzo-soprano, pianoforte, before 1916
Ik moet mijn boot te water laten, Nu mogen alle vregdewijzen zich mengen; De zieke buur (F. Pauwels) orchestra, 1922
In den stroom (H. Keuls), song, 1924
Feestlied (Keuls), soprano, pianoforte/orchestra, 1926
Om de stilte (Keuls), song, 1940
Mère (3 poèmes de M. Carême), low violin, pianoforte, 1950
De ramp (Renée), song, 1953

References

1878 births
1969 deaths
20th-century classical composers
Dutch women classical composers
Dutch classical composers
People from Semarang
20th-century women composers